Chartreuse of Liget was a monastery of hermit-monks of the  Carthusians order in France, founded in 1178 in Touraine by Henry II, Count of Anjou and King of England, in atonement for the murder of Thomas Becket (Archbishop of Canterbury) committed on his command.

The Liget is one of five Carthusian outposts founded before the 15th century in Western Europe. There are only a few remains of the medieval monastery ruined by the Hundred Years War and the French Wars of Religion. Rebuilt at the end of the Ancien Régime, it was largely demolished in the French Revolution.

Many relics of the monastery itself are part of the inventory of Monument historique under the designation "listed monument" or as a "registered monument" (the grounds of a former monastery wall and corner towers, remains of the church and cloister roof joint); In all cases, this level of protection was gained on March 13, 1972.

The Corroirie, the fortified gate, the chapel and the old prison were the subjects of an entry in the inventory of historical monuments from the 7 September 1926.

The Chapel of St. John the Liget is a historic monument by the list of 1862.

Location 

History of Chartreuse

Foundation 

From its inception in 1151, Henry II, Count of Anjou and King of England, confirmed his authority and Touraine became the center of the Plantagenet empire stretching from the Scottish border to the Pyrenees. The empire made Chinon its capital and encouraged the founding of new monasteries of the Gregorian reform.

It is in this context that in 1153 Henry II allowed four Carthusian hermits from Grande Chartreuse (Grande Chartreuse was founded in 1084 by Saint Bruno), to settle in a place called Ligetum bought from Hervé,  Abbey of Villeloin, to found a monastery. The name "Ligetum", of Germanic origin, refers to a barren place, mostly wooded. The founding deed was dated 1178, was confirmed in 1199 by King John of England and in 1234 by Louis IX of France.

Is the reason behind creation of this monastery to make atonement for the murder of Thomas Becket? No mention of this is made in contemporary documents and the legend seems to rely on an inscription, now lost, which adorned the main gate of the Chartreuse.

Rapid Expansion of Domain 
Following the example of other Carthusian monasteries, the Liget Carthusians worked quickly to expand their domain.

The gift of Henry II in 1178 included the grounds of Liget and five farms. They were the desert of the hermitage, an area that Chartreux wanted to occupy and for which they had the exclusive right to buy all the land. No acquisition beyond the limits of this "desert" was possible. The Carthusians built their Corroirie. This fief supervised many farms making a total of 800 hectares of land, meadows, pastures, gardens and vineyards. There was also more than 500 hectares of forest and 43 hectares of ponds. The initial building had only twelve monastic cells. In 1363, Charles V founded thirteen more and Chartreux was allowed to acquire 300 pounds of annual rent on the royal domain.

The Hundred Years War 
From the Treaty of Brétigny in 1360, which formalised a truce in the Hundred Years War, the Anglo-Gascon had to vacate the places they had taken in Touraine. During their retreat, the soldiers turned into looters. They pillaged the city of Tours. In 1361, the Carthusians who had taken refuge in their lower house in Corroirie, suffered a siege by English gangs. After the siege, about 1379, they dismissed their servants and fled to Loches in a house they had bought. When they returned to Liget in the early 15th century, they equipped Corroirie with the fortifications that still exist today in part. From a stately manor, Corroirie became a fortress. It served as a refuge during the wars of religion. By letters patent of Charles VII of France dated 12 July 1432, it was even equipped with a garrison by royal command.

The Second Peak 17th and 18th centuries 
Between 1598 (Edict of Nantes) and 1629 (death of the Cardinal of Bérulle), spirituality in France was experiencing a boom period. Eventually the Catholic revival flourished until 1660 under the leadership of theologians and intellectuals like Jacques Gallemant but also zealous priests like Pierre de Bérulle, Vincent de Paul, Francis de Sales and Chartreux Dom Beaucousin, Prior of the Carthusians of Paris. True to their motto, Cartusia nunquam reformata quia nunquam deformata, the Chartreux traversed time without being either reformed or deformed. It was at this time that the Chartreuse Liget received some famous guests: Dom Marc d'Aix, for example, wrote a poem about Madeleine and lived in Liget for 54 years with Alphonse-Louis du Plessis de Richelieu, elder brother of Cardinal Richelieu. He retired in Liget of 1605-1607.

In 1681, the domain of Liget then extended over 1,000 hectares. The hermitage accumulating artifacts abandoned by generous donors like Hippolyte de Béthune, Count of Selles, nephew of the great Sully, who left in 1650 two paintings attributed to Caravaggio, recently discovered in the Church of St. Anthony of Loches.

The destruction of buildings during the Revolution 
On November 2, 1789, the National Assembly decided that all ecclesiastical possessions were placed at the disposal of the nation; the following year the property was sold by lots.

On May 10, 1790, a first visit to Chartreuse is made by the agents of District Chemillé-sur-Indrois. After this first visit, they identify 12 Carthusian monks. Two days later, a first inventory of the property took place. Inspectors enumerated 6900 volumes in the library. Heritage Chartreux was valued at 21,000 pounds.

Chartreuse was purchased as property of the state on August 19, 1791 for 25,300 livre by Louis-Victor-Bear Philippe Potier, Court Judge of Loches and John Ondet, a merchant of the same city. The buildings were transformed into stables. The Corroirie was, in turn, sold on June 1, 1791 for 7,000 pounds to Martin Legrand. The departure of the Chartreux seems to be the month of February 1791.

Rebuilding the Domain in the 19th Century 
On August 6, 1837, Como-Édmond Marsay, former Mayor of Loches bought part of Chartreuse, specifically, the cloister, the harvest room and the chapel. He died in 1838. on December 13, 1862, his two sons Edward and Arthur, having reached their majority, shared the possession of Chartreuse. After several transactions, Arthur de Marsay became sole owner of all of the Chartreuse, and undertook the initial work of conservation. In Liget, he acquired land and strove to restore the "desert" of Chartreux by buying land. At his death in 1888, his second son, René de Marsay, inherited Chartreuse and continued the work of his father. In 1899, he managed to restore Corroirie but he died in 1910 leaving no children. After World War I, the land therefore reverted to Henri de Marsay, his nephew, who moved to Liget in July 1919 with his wife. At his death in 1975, ownership of Liget covered 700 hectares. The land was then divided among his six daughters.

Today, much of the Chartreuse belongs to Ms. Elijah Benedict Arnold, born Anne-Marie de Marsay. The other great part, including Corroirie is occupied by the Countess Guy Boula de Mareüil, born Germaine de Marsay.

The Liget, a Chartreuse Built on a Classic Plan  
La Chartreuse du Liget, like all Chartreuse monstaries, is composed of two parts: a 'High House' that houses the cells of the Fathers, and 'Lower House' home to Brothers.

On both sides, there must be added, specificity at Liget, an isolated chapel in a clearing not far from the 'High House'.

The High House 
On plans left by the architect Jacquemin Touraine in 1787, we can get an idea of the buildings that formed the "High House". Located at the bottom of a bowl near a waterhole surrounded by forest, the Upper House at Liget included two courses. The outdoor courtyard was flanked by long buildings containing the common kitchen, bread oven, blacksmith and other workshops. The small cloister or courtyard overlooked the chapter house, refectory, library and church. Behind the church was the large cloister which contained the cemetery. At least 17 individual cells of the monks were in this cloister. Each cell was completely independent. It consisted of a pavilion floor surrounded by a garden.

Low House 
Affixed to the 'High House', a place of prayer, the 'Lower House' or Corroirie is itself close to the earth and its benefits, ensuring the material existence of monks (Corroirie comes from the Latin Conderium or Conderia, which refers to everything the monks need to survive: food, clothing and maintenance). There are mills, a pressl and barns. A chapel, built in the 14th century, stands in the grounds of Corroirie of Liget. The latter is also the place which carries manorial rights. As such, the Carthusian therefore constituted a feudal power in Touraine. They enjoyed all privileges, including the right to justice, repeatedly renewed until 1789.

The Chapel of St. John 
This chapel, built by Jean Sans Terre in the 12th century, was probably built to commemorate the original establishment of the first Carthusian Fathers at Liget, and shortly after it was founded. The Church of the Chartreuse like this chapel are to be classified in the secondary Romanesque style "Plantagenet". The interior had to be completely covered with frescoes dating from the end of the 12th century or beginning of the 13th century. It was abandoned by the Carthusians from the 16th century.

What Remains

The Chartreuse 
 The monumental entrance gate is in the north wall of the monastery. From the 12th century, it is topped by a tympanum decorated with a bas-relief on the outside of St. Bruno (founder of the Carthusian order) and inside John the Baptist praying, the patron saint of the monastery. 
 Nothing remains of the Romanesque church, whose construction was completed in 1189, the walls of the nave in four sections. The facade still has its arched door. The arches and the tower which were built on top of the chancel and apse which closed the dormitory have disappeared. Acoustic pottery is embedded in the walls of the nave to improve the sound inside the church.
 The rectangular grand cloister - a characteristic architectural element of Carthusian monasteries - whose reconstruction had begun two years before the start of the French Revolution under the direction of Touraine architect Jean-Bernard-Abraham Jacquemin. is badly damaged. Little remains of the west wing. On the walls of grand cloister are still visible several windows that allowed the serving of meals, taken in their cells by hermit monks.
 The walls of the protected area of the Chartreuse are high. At each corner was built a watchtower. In the northwest corner of the cloister is a more elaborate watchtower. Such a defense and protection were built following the religious wars during which the monastery was plundered and devastated several times.

The Corroirie 
 The fortified gate, rebuilt in the 15th century, is in the form of a square tower provided with a walkway protected by battlements, breached by a door and a postern formerly defended by drawbridges.
 The chapel dates from the end of the 12th century, but was raised in the 15th century in two stages; the first is equipped with arrowslits. Its very simple plan has a nave with an apse extended by two four-sided bays.
 The prison is a turret isolated from the other buildings. Its only access was through a door opening upstairs; the cell being located on the ground floor.

The Chapel of St. John of Liget 
Built in the twelfth century, the chapel, dedicated to Saint-Jean-Baptiste, is located in the town of Sennevières, bordering Chemillé-sur-Indrois about  "as the crow flies" southwest of chartreuse, back from the road from Loches to Montrésor. It is almost in its original state. It probably commemorates the original settlement of monks in the region.

Eight semicircular windows illuminate the rotunda.

Some of the frescoes decorating the chapel have survived; they are on the panels which separate windows. Dating from the early 13th century, they figuratively illustrate the great mysteries of Christianity. Restoration work was undertaken in 2008.

See also
 Chartreux
 Saint Bruno

Sources

Works used for writing this article 
 Archives Départementales d'Indre-et-Loire (Departmental Archives of Indre-et-Loire), H 167 to H 193

Other books on the subject

Notes

References

References From the Departmental Archives of Indre-et-Loire

Other References

External links
 
 
 

Carthusian monasteries in France
Buildings and structures in Indre-et-Loire